Jose W. Diokno Boulevard, officially J. W. Diokno Boulevard, is a  long major collector road that runs north–south along the eastern perimeter of the SM Mall of Asia complex and parallel to Macapagal Boulevard in Bay City, Metro Manila, Philippines. It provides access from the Cultural Center of the Philippines Complex (CCP Complex) and Roxas Boulevard north to the shopping and lifestyle hub by Manila Bay in Pasay. Motorists tend to use the highway as the less congested alternative route from Manila to the Bay City vis-à-vis its parallel partner road in Macapagal Boulevard. It also connects to Entertainment City further south in Parañaque, and unlike Macapagal Boulevard is situated along the coastline overlooking Manila Bay.

The 8-lane median-divided boulevard was formerly known as Bay Boulevard. It was renamed in 2007, including the short extension of Gil Puyat Avenue in CCP Complex which connects it to Roxas Boulevard, after Jose Wright Diokno, the founding chair of the Commission on Human Rights, Free Legal Assistance Group (FLAG) founder, and former Filipino senator. The road was constructed by the Philippine Reclamation Authority and was fully completed in 2011.

Route description

Jose W. Diokno Boulevard commences at the intersection with Roxas Boulevard by the World Trade Center Metro Manila as a direct continuation of Gil Puyat Avenue.

This section of the boulevard is dominated by a roundabout with a large globe in the middle, serving as the terminus to Epifanio de los Santos Avenue (EDSA).

After crossing the Redemptorist Channel, the boulevard enters Parañaque and the Aseana City and Entertainment City, both mixed-use developments. It then comes to a roundabout fronting Westside City Resorts World, where it continues to the southwest. It then intersects New Seaside Road, where NAIAX At-Grade continues and leaves the boulevard. It passes through the Okada Manila development before entering Marina Asiaworld City, where its southern terminus at or near Pacific Avenue is located.

Landmarks

 Ayala Malls Manila Bay
 CCP Open Field
 CITEM (Center for International Trade Expositions and Missions)
 Government Service Insurance System Center
 Senate of the Philippines
 Kingsford Hotel Manila
 Manila Film Center
 Monarch Parksuites
 Okada Manila
 Philippine Trade Training Center
 Resorts World Bayshore Residential
 SM Mall of Asia
 Four E-Com Center
 Globe Rotunda
 LUXE Duty Free
 Mall of Asia Arena
 Mall of Asia Arena Annex (MAAX) Building
 Mall of Asia Ferry Terminal
 One Esplanade Events Venue
 SM by the Bay Amusement Park
 SM Corporate Office
 SMX Convention Center
 Solaire Resort & Casino
 World Trade Center

Notes

References

Streets in Metro Manila